Sheila S. Gwaltney (born 1954) is a retired U.S. diplomat.

Early life and education
Gwaltney is from Woodland, California. Gwaltney earned a Bachelor of Arts in international relations at the University of California, Davis, and a Master's degree at George Washington University. Gwaltney speaks Russian, Ukrainian, and Spanish.

Career
Gwaltney joined the Department of State in 1984. Her overseas assignments have included Panama, Pretoria, and St. Petersburg. At the Department of State in Washington, D.C., she has also served as Deputy Director for the Office of Russian Affairs, Special Assistant to the Under Secretary of State for Political Affairs, and Director of Country Affairs for Eurasia. During her Foreign Service career, Gwaltney also spent one year at the Hoover Institution at Stanford University as a National Security Affairs Fellow. She has also served as the Deputy Chief of Mission at the U.S. embassies in Bishkek (1999–2001), Kyiv (2004–2007), and Moscow (2011–2014).

On August 28, 2014, President Barack Obama nominated Gwaltney to be the United States Ambassador to Kyrgyzstan. She was confirmed by the Senate about a year later, on August 5, 2015.  She retired from that post in August 2017.

Gwaltney is the recipient of several Department of State Superior and Meritorious Honor Awards.

References

1954 births
Living people
Ambassadors of the United States to Kyrgyzstan
George Washington University alumni
People from Woodland, California
University of California, Davis alumni
21st-century American diplomats
United States Foreign Service personnel
American women ambassadors
21st-century American women